James William Flavin Jr. (May 14, 1906 – April 23, 1976) was an American character actor whose career lasted for nearly half a century.

Early life
The son of a hotel waiter of Canadian-English descent, the Portland, Maine-born Flavin attended the United States Military Academy, where he played football.

Career 

Summer stock companies flocked to Maine each year, and in 1929 Flavin was asked to fill in for an actor. He did well with the part and the company manager offered him $150 per week to accompany the troupe back to New York. Flavin accepted and by the spring of 1930, he resided in a rooming house at 108 W. 87th Street in Manhattan.

Flavin worked his way across the country in stock productions and tours, arriving in Los Angeles around 1932. He quickly made the transition to movies, landing the lead role in his very first film, a Universal serial, The Airmail Mystery (1932). He married his costar in that film, Lucile Browne, that same year. The serial marked virtually the last time that Flavin would play the lead in a film. Thereafter, he was restricted almost exclusively to supporting characters, many of whom were unnamed. He specialized in uniformed cops and hard-bitten detectives, but also played chauffeurs, cabbies, and even a 16th-century palace guard.

Flavin appeared in nearly four hundred films between 1932 and 1971. He appeared in almost one hundred television episodes, including the NBC sitcom, The People's Choice, starring Jackie Cooper, several episodes as police Detective Sawyer, who was being driven nuts by Gracie Allen on The Burns and Allen Show, and three times as a sheriff on the western aviation adventure series, Sky King, before his final appearance, as U.S. President Dwight D. Eisenhower, in Francis Gary Powers: The True Story of the U-2 Spy Incident (1976), a dramatization of the shooting down in 1960 by the former Soviet Union of the U-2 pilot, Francis Gary Powers.

Flavin portrayed Sam Cooper in the 1958 episode, "The Ed Church Case", of the CBS crime drama series, Richard Diamond, Private Detective, starring David Janssen. In 1959, he guest starred as Big Dan Girod in the episode, "Invitation to a Murder", on the ABC/WB detective series, Bourbon Street Beat, starring Andrew Duggan. In 1960, Flavin appeared in The Twilight Zone episode "A Passage for Trumpet".

From 1960 to 1962, Flavin was cast as Robert Howard in 33 episodes of the ABC/Warner Brothers drama series, The Roaring 20s, starring with Dorothy Provine, Donald May, Rex Reason, John Dehner, Gary Vinson, and Mike Road.

From 1960 to 1962, Flavin appeared three times on the CBS sitcom, Pete and Gladys, with Harry Morgan and Cara Williams. He also had a recurring role on CBS' talking-horse sitcom Mister Ed as Mr. Kramer, the stable owner.  Flavin portrayed Fire Chief Hawkins in the 1964 episode, "Beyond a Reasonable Doubt", on the NBC education drama series, Mr. Novak, starring James Franciscus.

Flavin made his Broadway debut in the 1969 revival of The Front Page, in which he played Murphy and briefly took over the lead role of Walter Burns from Robert Ryan.

Death
Flavin died at Cedars-Sinai Medical Center in Los Angeles, California, on April 23, 1976 after suffering a heart attack. His widow, Lucile Browne Flavin, died 17 days later. The couple is interred at Holy Cross Cemetery in Culver City, California.

Selected filmography

 The Airmail Mystery (1932) as Bob Lee
 McKenna of the Mounted (1932) as Corporal Randall McKenna
 Back Street (1932) as Reporter (uncredited)
 Okay, America! (1932) as Minor Role (uncredited)
 The Most Dangerous Game (1932) as First Mate on Yacht (uncredited)
 The All American (1932) as Don Lindsay
 Air Mail (1932) as Man with Radio Report (uncredited)
 Hot Pepper (1933) as Second Policeman (uncredited)
 King Kong (1933) as Second Mate Briggs
 Hello, Sister! (1933) as Fireman
 Riot Squad (1933) as Det. Mack McCue
 Ship of Wanted Men (1933) as Frank Busch
 Only Yesterday (1933) as Billy (uncredited)
 Beloved (1934) as Wilcox
 The Big Race (1934) as Bill Figg
 The Crosby Case (1934) as Detective O'Shea (uncredited)
 Affairs of a Gentleman (1934) as Donovan (uncredited)
 Wild Gold (1934) as Detective (uncredited)
 Now I'll Tell (1934) as Cop on Beach (uncredited)
 Baby Take a Bow (1934) as Flannigan
 The Affairs of Cellini (1934) as Palace Guard (uncredited)
 Gift of Gab (1934) as Alumni President (uncredited)
 Wake Up and Dream (1934) as Cop (uncredited)
 The Brand of Hate (1934) as Holt Larkins
 Bright Eyes (1934) as Bob - Pilot (uncredited)
 Society Doctor (1935) as Detective Ewing (uncredited)
 After Office Hours (1935) as Police Detective (uncredited)
 Secrets of Chinatown (1935) as Brandhma
 Death Flies East (1935) as Co-Pilot (uncredited)
 Captain Hurricane (1935) as Freighter Officer (uncredited)
 Straight from the Heart (1935) as Policeman (uncredited)
 G Men (1935) as Agent with Jean (uncredited)
 Public Hero No. 1 (1935) as Flavin - Federal Agent (uncredited)
 People Will Talk (1935) as First Reporter (uncredited)
 Chinatown Squad (1935) as Detective (uncredited)
 Silk Hat Kid (1935) as Gangster (uncredited)
 The Murder Man (1935) as Policeman at Merry-Go-Round (uncredited)
 The Daring Young Man (1935) as Informant on Telephone (uncredited)
 Woman Wanted (1935) as Mac - Policeman (uncredited)
 Man on the Flying Trapeze (1935) as Henry - Chauffeur (uncredited)
 Special Agent (1935) as Agent Arresting Julie (uncredited)
 Shipmates Forever (1935) as Instructing Officer (uncredited)
 Rendezvous (1935) as 2nd Military Policeman (uncredited)
 Remember Last Night? (1935) as Policeman (uncredited)
 One Way Ticket (1935) as Ed
 The Littlest Rebel (1935) as Yankee Guard (uncredited)
 Magnificent Obsession (1935) as Chauffeur (uncredited)
 Song and Dance Man (1936) as Taxi Driver (uncredited)
 Charlie Chan at the Race Track (1936) as Detective at Headquarters (uncredited)
 Straight from the Shoulder (1936) as Policeman (uncredited)
 My Man Godfrey (1936) as Detective #2 (uncredited)
 They Met in a Taxi (1936) as Policeman (uncredited)
 The Luckiest Girl in the World (1936) as Policeman
 Two in a Crowd (1936) as Policeman (uncredited)
 The Magnificent Brute (1936) as Hunkie Partner (uncredited)
 Born to Dance (1936) as Ship's Officer (uncredited)
 Mysterious Crossing (1936) as Plainclothesman (uncredited)
 Dangerous Number (1937) as Cab Driver (uncredited)
 You Only Live Once (1937) as State Trooper (uncredited)
 Let's Get Married (1937) as Dolan (uncredited)
 Midnight Taxi (1937) as Detective McCormick (uncredited)
 Motor Madness (1937) as Miller (uncredited)
 I Promise to Pay (1937) as Bill Seaver
 That I May Live (1937) as Policeman (uncredited)
 San Quentin (1937) as Guard Announcing Jailbreak (uncredited)
 The League of Frightened Men (1937) as Joe
 This Is My Affair (1937) as Prison Guard (uncredited)
 Angel's Holiday (1937) as Detective (uncredited)
 Married Before Breakfast (1937) as Police Passenger (uncredited)
 Girls Can Play (1937) as Bill O'Malley
 Fit for a King (1937) as Ship's Officer (uncredited)
 Big City (1937) as Comet Cab Driver (uncredited)
 My Dear Miss Aldrich (1937) as Dr. Spitzy Calahan (uncredited)
 Charlie Chan on Broadway (1937) as Detective (uncredited)
 Dangerously Yours (1937) as Driver (uncredited)
 Hot Water (1937) as Policeman (uncredited)
 Live, Love and Learn (1937) as Marine Who Likes Painting (uncredited)
 Thoroughbreds Don't Cry (1937) as Timmie's Agent (uncredited)
 45 Fathers (1937) as Policeman (uncredited)
 Big Town Girl (1937) as State Trooper (uncredited)
 Mannequin (1937) as Burly Man (uncredited)
 The Bad Man of Brimstone (1937) as Second Federal Marshal (uncredited)
 The Buccaneer (1938) as British Sergeant (uncredited)
 Everybody's Doing It (1938) as Detective Hayes (uncredited)
 Penitentiary (1938) as Doran (uncredited)
 Born to Be Wild (1938) as Striker (uncredited)
 Night Spot (1938) as Kidnapper (uncredited)
 Start Cheering (1938) as Gas Station Attendant (uncredited)
 Test Pilot (1938) as Pilot (uncredited)
 Alexander's Ragtime Band (1938) as Army Captain (uncredited)
 Wives Under Suspicion (1938) as Jenks - Chauffeur (uncredited)
 Speed to Burn (1938) as Radio Car Policeman (uncredited)
 The Shopworn Angel (1938) as Guard Yelling 'Halt!' (uncredited)
 Gateway (1938) as Guard (uncredited)
 I Am the Law (1938) as George - Witness (uncredited)
 You Can't Take It with You (1938) as Jailer (uncredited)
 Three Loves Has Nancy (1938) as Jack's Friend (uncredited)
 Too Hot to Handle (1938) as Young Reporter (uncredited)
 Time Out for Murder (1938) as Police Sergeant at Roundup (uncredited)
 Lightning Carson Rides Again (1938) as Justice Department Agent
 The Arkansas Traveler (1938) as Trainman (uncredited)
 Five of a Kind (1938) as Policeman (uncredited)
 Blondie (1938) as Policeman in Accident Car (uncredited)
 Ride a Crooked Mile (1938) as Hack (uncredited)
 Convicts at Large (1938) as Detective Sgt. Berkovich
 While New York Sleeps (1938) as 2nd Cop (uncredited)
 The Duke of West Point (1938) as Plebe Hockey Coach #1
 Swing, Sister, Swing (1938) as Pilot (scenes deleted)
 Sweethearts (1938) as Melody Theater Doorman (uncredited)
 Thanks for Everything (1938) as Policeman
 Charlie Chan in Honolulu (1938) as Homicide Division Desk Sergeant (uncredited)
 Jesse James (1939) as Cavalry Captain (uncredited)
 Pardon Our Nerve (1939) as Policeman (uncredited)
 The Ice Follies of 1939 (1939) as Doorman (uncredited)
 Sergeant Madden (1939) as Police Interrogator (uncredited)
 Everybody's Baby (1939) as Police Announcer (uncredited)
 Code of the Streets (1939) as Doorman
 The Lady's from Kentucky (1939) as Policeman (uncredited)
 Union Pacific (1939) as Paddy (uncredited)
 Big Town Czar (1939) as George Mitchell (uncredited)
 Rose of Washington Square (1939) as Guard (uncredited)
 Tell No Tales (1939) as Officer Simmons (uncredited)
 They Asked for It (1939) as Cop (uncredited)
 Unmarried (1939) as Oil Driller (uncredited)
 The Gracie Allen Murder Case (1939) as Turnkey (uncredited)
 6,000 Enemies (1939) as Ring Announcer (uncredited)
 Mickey the Kid (1939) as Sanders
 They All Come Out (1939) as Officer (uncredited)
 Each Dawn I Die (1939) as Policeman (uncredited)
 They Shall Have Music (1939) as Police Sergeant (uncredited)
 Mr. Wong in Chinatown (1939) as Sergeant Jerry
 When Tomorrow Comes (1939) as Coast Guard Man on Road (uncredited)
 Irish Luck (1939) as Hotel Detective Fluger
 Calling All Marines (1939) as Sgt. Smith
 Fast and Furious (1939) as Policeman Guarding Entrance (uncredited)
 The Roaring Twenties (1939) as Policeman (uncredited)
 Joe and Ethel Turp Call on the President (1939) as Policeman (uncredited)
 The Cisco Kid and the Lady (1939) as Sergeant O'Riley
 Remember the Night (1940) as Court Attendant (uncredited)
 The Grapes of Wrath (1940) as Guard (uncredited)
 The Fighting 69th (1940) as Supply Sergeant (uncredited)
 Broadway Melody of 1940 (1940) as Bouncer (uncredited)
 Castle on the Hudson (1940) as Death Row Guard (uncredited)
 Framed (1940) as Cop (uncredited)
 Double Alibi (1940) as Patrolman Johnson (uncredited)
 Women Without Names (1940) as Guard (uncredited)
 Johnny Apollo (1940) as Guard in Library (uncredited)
 And One Was Beautiful (1940) as McRafferty - Jail Guard (uncredited)
 It All Came True (1940) as Roaring 90's Club Doorman (uncredited)
 Those Were the Days! (1940) as Policeman (uncredited)
 Hot Steel (1940) as Storm Swenson
 Girl in 313 (1940) as Det. Carvin
 La Conga Nights (1940) as Grogan (uncredited)
 The Way of All Flesh (1940) as Policeman (uncredited)
 Florian (1940) as Policeman (uncredited)
 The Ghost Breakers (1940) as Hotel Porter (uncredited)
 Brother Orchid (1940) as Parking Attendant at Fat Dutchy's (uncredited)
 Lucky Cisco Kid (1940) as Ranch Foreman (uncredited)
 The Man Who Talked Too Much (1940) as Pete - Prison Guard (uncredited)
 Queen of the Mob (1940) as Third FBI Director
 Sailor's Lady (1940) as Motorcycle Cop (uncredited)
 Private Affairs (1940) as Doorman (uncredited)
 Manhattan Heartbeat (1940) as Truck Driver
 South of Pago Pago (1940) as Cafe Customer
 When the Daltons Rode (1940) as Annabella's Brother (uncredited)
 The Golden Fleecing (1940) as Cop (uncredited)
 Rhythm on the River (1940) as Detective (uncredited)
 The Great Profile (1940) as Detective
 Yesterday's Heroes (1940) as Scout (uncredited)
 Knute Rockne All American (1940) as Army Assistant Coach (uncredited)
 The Long Voyage Home (1940) as Dock Policeman (uncredited)
 North West Mounted Police (1940) as Mountie (uncredited)
 The Devil's Pipeline (1940) as Dowling
 Dancing on a Dime (1940) as Policeman (uncredited)
 Youth Will Be Served (1940) as Buck Miller
 Street of Memories (1940) as Dance Hall Manager (uncredited)
 Give Us Wings (1940) as Mr. White (uncredited)
 Tin Pan Alley (1940) as Army Sergeant (uncredited)
 Four Mothers (1941) as Demolition Man (uncredited)
 High Sierra (1941) as Policeman (uncredited)
 Tall, Dark and Handsome (1941) as Detective in Cigar Store (uncredited)
 The Wild Man of Borneo (1940) as Policeman (uncredited)
 Mr. & Mrs. Smith (1941) as Attractive Woman's Escort (uncredited)
 Buck Privates (1941) as Recruiting Sergeant (uncredited)
 Western Union (1941) as Deputy Sheriff (uncredited)
 The Strawberry Blonde (1941) as Ticket Inspector on Boat (uncredited)
 Footsteps in the Dark (1941) as Police Broadcaster (uncredited)
 Pot o' Gold (1941) as Sheriff Bud Connolly (uncredited)
 Ride on Vaquero (1941) as Officer Johnson (uncredited)
 Ziegfeld Girl (1941) as Buck - Truck Driver (uncredited)
 The People vs. Dr. Kildare (1941) as Bob Hackley (uncredited)
 Reaching for the Sun (1941) as First Guard (uncredited)
 Affectionately Yours (1941) as Tomassetti
 Adventure in Washington (1941) as Matty (uncredited)
 Sunny (1941) as Motorcycle Cop (uncredited)
 The Bride Came C.O.D. (1941) as Interrogating Detective (uncredited)
 Manpower (1941) as Orderly About to Give Bath (uncredited)
 Life Begins for Andy Hardy (1941) as Policeman (uncredited)
 Belle Starr (1941) as Sergeant
 Hold Back the Dawn (1941) as Immigration Guard (uncredited)
 We Go Fast (1941) as Police Lt. Bardette
 Texas (1941) as Abilene Fight Announcer (uncredited)
 Great Guns (1941) as Army Captain at White Army Tent (uncredited)
 I Wake Up Screaming (1941) as Detective (uncredited)
 New York Town (1941) as Recruiting Sergeant (uncredited)
 Skylark (1941) as Subway Guard (uncredited)
 Shadow of the Thin Man (1941) as Cop Who Greets Nick at Racetrack (uncredited)
 The Night of January 16th (1941) as Patrolman Kelly
 Kathleen (1941) as Moving Man
 Bedtime Story (1941) as Hotel Guest in Room 625 (uncredited)
 You're in the Army Now (1941) as Officer (uncredited)
 Treat 'Em Rough (1942) as Joe Trosper
 Mr. and Mrs. North (1942) as Police Captain (uncredited)
 A Yank on the Burma Road (1942) as Police Radio Dispatcher (uncredited)
 Ride 'Em Cowboy (1942) as Railroad Detective #2 (uncredited)
 Born to Sing (1942) as Cop (uncredited)
 Reap the Wild Wind (1942) as Girl's Father (uncredited)
 Broadway (1942) as Doorman (uncredited)
 To the Shores of Tripoli (1942) as Warden (uncredited)
 Juke Box Jenny (1942) as First Customs Officer
 Kid Glove Killer (1942) as Keenan - Detective Grilling Eddie (uncredited)
 Saboteur (1942) as Motorcycle Cop (voice, uncredited)
 Fingers at the Window (1942) as Lt. Schaeffer
 Larceny, Inc. (1942) as Bank Guard (uncredited)
 Yankee Doodle Dandy (1942) as Union Army Veteran #1 on Caisson (uncredited)
 Juke Girl (1942) as Atlanta Policeman (uncredited)
 Ten Gentlemen from West Point (1942) as Capt. Luddy
 Tough As They Come (1942) as Process Server (uncredited)
 The Big Shot (1942) as Detective (uncredited)
 Thru Different Eyes (1942) as Thomas
 Night in New Orleans (1942) as Egan (uncredited)
 Iceland (1942) as Sergeant (uncredited)
 Gentleman Jim (1942) as George Corbett (uncredited)
 Life Begins at Eight-Thirty (1942) as Policeman (uncredited)
 City Without Men (1943) as Coast Guard Officer (uncredited)
 Air Force (1943) as Maj. A.M. Bagley
 Something to Shout About (1943) as Policeman (uncredited)
 It Ain't Hay (1943) as Cop (uncredited)
 Hello, Frisco, Hello (1943) as Headwaiter (uncredited)
 Mission to Moscow (1943) as American Senator (uncredited)
 Action in the North Atlantic (1943) as Merchant Marine School Lieutenant-Commander (uncredited)
 Heaven Can Wait (1943) as Policeman (uncredited)
 Swing Shift Maisie (1943) as Radio Policeman (uncredited)
 So Proudly We Hail! (1943) as Capt. O'Brien (uncredited)
 Murder on the Waterfront (1943) as Cmdr. George Kalin
 Thank Your Lucky Stars (1943) as Policeman (uncredited)
 Corvette K-225 (1943) as 1st Lt. Bill Gardner
 I Dood It (1943) as Federal Agent (uncredited)
 Footlight Glamour (1943) as Mr. Phillips (uncredited)
 The Iron Major (1943) as Football Umpire (uncredited)
 Riding High (1943) as Train Conductor (uncredited)
 There's Something About a Soldier (1943) as Civilian Brawler (uncredited)
 Ladies Courageous (1944) as Gardner (uncredited)
 Four Jills in a Jeep (1944) as MP Sergeant (uncredited)
 Uncertain Glory (1944) as Captain of Mobile Guard
 Bermuda Mystery (1944) as Dempsey (uncredited)
 Once Upon a Time (1944) as Skeptic on Subway (uncredited)
 Christmas Holiday (1944) as Policeman (uncredited)
 Mr. Winkle Goes to War (1944) as Sergeant (uncredited)
 Abroad with Two Yanks (1944) as Sgt. Wiggins
 Strange Affair (1944) as Bank Security Guard (uncredited)
 Laura (1944) as Det. McEveety (uncredited)
 The Princess and the Pirate (1944) as Naval Officer (uncredited)
 Hollywood Canteen (1944) as Marine Sergeant (uncredited)
 Here Come the Waves (1944) as Shore Patrolman (uncredited)
 Together Again (1944) as Policeman (uncredited)
 God Is My Co-Pilot (1945) as Major at Kweilin Airbase (uncredited)
 Without Love (1945) as Sergeant (uncredited)
 Circumstantial Evidence (1945) as Guard (uncredited)
 Pillow to Post (1945) as Louie - Army Sergeant in Jeep (uncredited)
 Don Juan Quilligan (1945) as Police Sergeant (uncredited)
 Wonder Man (1945) as Bus Driver (uncredited)
 Conflict (1945) as Det. Lt. Workman (uncredited)
 Murder, He Says (1945) as Police Officer (uncredited)
 Within These Walls (1945) as Guard (uncredited)
 Anchors Aweigh (1945) as Radio Cop
 Over 21 (1945) as Captain (uncredited)
 Incendiary Blonde (1945) as Mounted Policeman (uncredited)
 The Shanghai Cobra (1945) as H.R. Jarvis
 Duffy's Tavern (1945) as Cop (uncredited)
 Mildred Pierce (1945) as Detective (uncredited)
 Johnny Angel (1945) as Flavin - Mate of the Quincy (uncredited)
 Hold That Blonde (1945) as Laundry Truck Driver (uncredited)
 Masquerade in Mexico (1945) as FBI Agent (uncredited)
 San Antonio (1945) as Streeter - Cattleman (uncredited)
 The Spider (1945) as Officer Johnny Tracy
 Tars and Spars (1946) as Chief Bosun Mate Gurney (uncredited)
 Young Widow (1946) as Subway Conductor (uncredited)
 Sentimental Journey (1946) as Detective Sgt. McFarland (uncredited)
 The Hoodlum Saint (1946) as Man Assigning Numbers at Dance Contest (uncredited)
 A Stolen Life (1946) as Investigator (uncredited)
 Her Kind of Man (1946) as Evans (uncredited)
 The Strange Love of Martha Ivers (1946) as Detective #1
 Easy to Wed (1946) as Joe
 Boys' Ranch (1946) as Baseball Stadium Policeman (uncredited)
 Rendezvous with Annie (1946) as Turnkey
 Courage of Lassie (1946) as Lt. Tom Arnold (uncredited)
 It Shouldn't Happen to a Dog (1946) as Police Lieutenant (uncredited)
 The Missing Lady (1946) as Police Insp. Cardona
 Step by Step (1946) as Woods (uncredited)
 Cloak and Dagger (1946) as Col. Walsh
 Angel on My Shoulder (1946) as Bellamy
 Two Years Before the Mast (1946) as Crimp (uncredited)
 Nobody Lives Forever (1946) as Shake Thomas
 The Mighty McGurk (1947) as Police Officer (uncredited)
 Ladies' Man (1947) as Automat Manager (uncredited)
 Easy Come, Easy Go (1947) as Plainclothes Man (uncredited)
 Nora Prentiss (1947) as District Attorney
 The Fabulous Dorseys (1947) as Gorman
 My Favorite Brunette (1947) as Det. Lt. 'Mac' Hennessey (uncredited)
 Lost Honeymoon (1947) as Officer Max Riley (uncredited)
 It Happened on Fifth Avenue (1947) as First Policeman (uncredited)
 Dishonored Lady (1947) as Police Sgt. Patella (uncredited)
 Robin Hood of Texas (1947) as Police Captain Danforth
 Desert Fury (1947) as Sheriff Pat Johnson
 Song of the Thin Man (1947) as Reardon - Police Officer (uncredited)
 Black Gold (1947) as Mac - Race Clerk (uncredited)
 Joe Palooka in the Knockout (1947) as Policeman
 Unconquered (1947) as Villager (uncredited)
 Nightmare Alley (1947) as Hoatley - First Carnival Owner (uncredited)
 Sleep, My Love (1948) as Police Lt. Mitchell (uncredited)
 My Girl Tisa (1948) as Guard (uncredited)
 The Noose Hangs High (1948) as Traffic Cop (uncredited)
 Fury at Furnace Creek (1948) as Judge Advocate (uncredited)
 Secret Service Investigator (1948) as Police Inspector Thorndyke
 The Velvet Touch (1948) as Sgt. Oliphant
 The Babe Ruth Story (1948) as First Mate at Ruth's Bar (uncredited)
 One Touch of Venus (1948) as Kerrigan
 The Return of October (1948) as Detention Ward Guard (uncredited)
 The Plunderers (1948) as Sergeant Major
 Bungalow 13 (1948) as Lt. Sam Wilson
 Shockproof (1949) as Policeman in Park (uncredited)
 Homicide (1949) as Det. Lt. Boylan
 My Dream Is Yours (1949) as Coconut Grove Waiter (uncredited)
 Flamingo Road (1949) as Angry Carnival Creditor (uncredited)
 Mississippi Rhythm (1949) as Stan Caldwell
 Mighty Joe Young (1949) as Schultz
 Abbott and Costello Meet the Killer, Boris Karloff (1949) as Insp. Wellman
 Blondie Hits the Jackpot (1949) as Brophy
 The Devil's Henchman (1949) as Police Sergeant Briggs
Prison Warden (1949) as Guard Capt. Peter Butler
 Key to the City (1950) as S.F. Cop - Costume Party Arrest (uncredited)
 When Willie Comes Marching Home (1950) as Gen. Brevort (uncredited)
 Dakota Lil (1950) as Secret Service Chief
 Rock Island Trail (1950) as Railroad Workman (uncredited)
 The Savage Horde (1950) as Guard
 Armored Car Robbery (1950) as Police Lt. Phillips
 Destination Murder (1950) as Police Lt. Brewster
 My Friend Irma Goes West (1950) as Sheriff (uncredited)
 South Sea Sinner (1950) as Andrews
 Operation Pacific (1951) as Mick - SP Commander (uncredited)
 Oh! Susanna (1951) as Captain Worth
 Up Front (1951) as Minor Role
 Follow the Sun (1951) as Henry Gibbs (uncredited)
 Fighting Coast Guard (1951) as Commander Rogers
 According to Mrs. Hoyle (1951) as Prosecuting Attorney
 Rhubarb (1951) as O'Leary, Manhattan Police Chief (uncredited)
 Come Fill the Cup (1951) as Russ - Homicide Captain (uncredited)
 Sailor Beware (1952) as Petty Officer (uncredited)
 The Fighter (1952) as Cop (uncredited)
 Jumping Jacks (1952) as Gen. Sterling (uncredited)
 Here Come the Marines (1952) as Col. Evans
 Carrie (1952) as Mike - Bartender (uncredited)
 O. Henry's Full House (1952) as Cop (segment "The Cop and the Anthem") (uncredited)
 My Pal Gus (1952) as Bailiff (uncredited)
 Million Dollar Mermaid (1952) as Conductor
 Star of Texas (1953) as Texas Rangers Capt. Sturdivant
 Confidentially Connie (1953) as Harry - Club Chairman (uncredited)
 Trouble Along the Way (1953) as Coach Buck Holman (uncredited)
 Abbott and Costello Go to Mars (1953) as First Policeman in Bank
 Francis Covers the Big Town (1953) as Detective Mulvaney (uncredited)
 Hot News (1953) as Al Bragg
 Fighter Attack (1953) as Col. Allison
 The Eddie Cantor Story (1953) as Kelly - Policeman (uncredited)
 Ma and Pa Kettle at Home (1954) as Motorcycle Cop (uncredited)
 I Beheld His Glory (1954) as Doctor (uncredited)
 Untamed Heiress (1954) as Policeman (uncredited)
 Massacre Canyon (1954) as Colonel Tarant (uncredited)
 Mister Roberts (1955) as Military Policeman
 Apache Ambush (1955) as Colonel Marshall
 The Naked Street (1955) as Attorney Michael X. Flanders
 Never Say Goodbye (1956) as Timmy
 Francis in the Haunted House (1956) as Police Chief Martin
 Top Secret Affair (1957) as American Legionnaire (uncredited)
 The Wings of Eagles (1957) as MP at Garden Party (uncredited)
 Hold That Hypnotist (1957) as Jake Morgan
 Footsteps in the Night (1957) as Mr. Bradbury
 The Restless Breed (1957) as Secret Service Chief
 Beau James (1957) as Capt. Dennis (uncredited)
 Night Passage (1957) as Tim Riley
 Wild Is the Wind (1957) as Wool Buyer
 Up in Smoke (1957) as Policeman
 The Last Hurrah (1958) as Police Capt. Michael J. Shanahan (uncredited)
 Johnny Rocco (1958) as Mooney
 Critic's Choice (1963) as Security Guard (uncredited)
 It's a Mad, Mad, Mad, Mad World (1963) as Patrolman (uncredited)
 Cheyenne Autumn (1964) as Ft. Robinson Sergeant of the Guard (uncredited)
 The Adventures of Bullwhip Griffin (1967) as Ship Ticket Agent (uncredited)
 Good Times (1967) as Lieutenant
 In Cold Blood (1967) as Clarence Duntz
 The Barefoot Executive (1971) as Father O'Leary

Notes

References

External links
 
James Flavin at Turner Classic Movies
 

1906 births
1976 deaths
Actors from Portland, Maine
Burials at Holy Cross Cemetery, Culver City
American people of Canadian descent
American people of English descent
American people of Irish descent
American male film actors
American male television actors
American male stage actors
20th-century American male actors
RKO Pictures contract players